The Western Lands is the fourth album by Gravenhurst, released on Warp Records.

Track listing
"Saints" - 3:24
"She Dances" - 4:01
"Hollow Men" - 3:58
"Song Among the Pine" - 4:11
"Trust" - 4:06
"The Western Lands" - 4:14
"Farewell, Farewell" - 3:14
"Hourglass" - 4:46
"Grand Union Canal" - 6:05
"The Collector" - 4:56

References

2007 albums
Gravenhurst (band) albums
Warp (record label) albums